The Parable of Arable Land is the first studio album by the Red Crayola (also known as Red Krayola). The album's title was coined by bassist Steve Cunningham. The album was considered psychedelic music when it was introduced, but later assessments describe it as a forerunner to avant/noise rock. With this album as introduction, Ritchie Unterberger assessed the band as a precursor to industrial rock. The album features free improvised pieces involving industrial power tools and a revving motorcycle dubbed "Free Form Freak-Out" as well as notable instrumental cameos by label mate and 13th Floor Elevators frontman Roky Erickson.

The Familiar Ugly
The Familiar Ugly was a group of 50 people who joined the Red Crayola on stage with music that was made on anything from industrial power tools to a revving motorcycle. They perform on the "Free Form Freak-Out" tracks that are present between each song on the album. Rick Barthelme later reflected. "At heart we were as elitist as could be, but these folks came to our shows and some we knew and most we did not know, but whenever we played, there they were, ready to mount the stage and screech until the last plug was pulled, and there we were, ready to invite them – the Familiar Ugly, we dubbed ’em."

After playing as a five-piece consisting of all three original members plus Bonnie Emerson and Danny Schacht, the group split back to the original trio and instead called every added member a part of the Familiar Ugly. "Free Form Freak-Out" was a term coined by record producer Lelan Rogers who proposed the idea of having the album intermingle songs with the Familiar Ugly, fading one into the other as well as having Rick Barthelme take up a tribal drumbeat instead of a standard rock beat for "War Sucks".

Mayo Thompson details the formation of the Familiar Ugly and the origin of "Free Form Freak-Out" in an interview conducted on December 26, 2011 "Conversation with Mayo Thompson: Part One"

Recording 
The Familiar Ugly were recorded on April Fool's Day 1967 in a three-hour evening session on one master tape, it was done on eight tracks with eight microphones, one per channel. The other tracks on the album were recorded on 3 different sessions from April–May (one of the sessions contained unreleased recordings titled "F.R.E.D" and "Water Vessel" but they have been presumed lost). Mayo Thompson said, "We went back and pieced it together so that it would have a flow to it and all the while we were naïve. We went in the studio, if we'd had our druthers, we would have multitracked the free form stuff, because we could have done more of our own thing. As it was, it was just frozen. It was a documentary relation, documenting the recording."
 
"Our first album was recorded mono. [The simulated stereo mix] is Walt Andrus' studio wizardry. We made the mono version and then like two days later I was around the studio, and they said, 'Come here, what about this for a stereo album?' And I sat there and listened to it and I said, 'sounds okay to me, crazy, but sounds okay.' For the stereo mix the songs were processed through a stereo effects chamber with added psychedelic effects (such as loops, reversed tapes, speed fluctuations and sound effects) for the stereo mix.

"And then over the next couple of days we went in and did the backing tracks — we played them live," with few overdubs. Vocal tracks on some songs, such as "War Sucks," were also recorded live. "When we had the backing tracks, Roky Erickson of the 13th Floor Elevators was invited in to play the organ part on 'Hurricane Fighter Plane' and played the mouth organ part on 'Transparent Radiation'."- Mayo Thompson talks about the recording of The Parable of Arable Land.

Music 
The band took influences from a variety of different artists, some of them were Frank Zappa, the Fugs and Albert Ayler . As well as avant-garde music composers John Cage and Harry Partch.

Mayo Thompson talked about the Red Krayola's relation with punk rock: "I would say, the mindset of those people in the '70s was something like our mindset in the mid-'60s.  They hated everything too that had happened before--'we're not necessarily going to clean the slate, but we're going to burn everything down and then we're going to start over again.  Or in the process, we're going to burn down everything as a starting over again.' And this relation was understood. So some people would say, this is proto-punk - that was where we got lumped, a little bit.  But the same things that were talked about the music then are the same things that people talk about it now - 'jazzy, broken, dada, blah blah.'"

Rick Barthelme had this to say about their music: "From our vantage out on the edge, Zappa and Velvet Underground, and other more conventionally strange bands, were ordinary musicians trying to do something different and still function within the rock & roll framework. We said fuck the framework, listen to this, motherfucker. And then busted your eardrum. And we did it over and over from 1966 to 1968. The first LP, The Parable of Arable Land, which was recorded early on at the Andrus studio, is a wonder if you are wasted, and a poor example otherwise, as the nice guy who recorded it did it on two tracks instead of thirty-two, thus flattening the thing out somewhat." When asked about the proto-punk label he responded with "I don't really know if that's true, but wouldn't it be lovely to think so?".

Production 
The album cover was drawn by George Banks, the informal manager of the 13th Floor Elevators - he was also the illustrator behind the album cover for Easter Everywhere and other International Artists releases.

Although all of the songs are credited as being written by the whole band, the truth was said on the second issue of Mother: Houston's Rock Magazine (1968) - "Hurricane Fighter Plane" was written by Thompson, the music to "Transparent Radiation" was written by Barthelme whilst the lyrics were written by Thompson, Barthelme and Thompson wrote the lyrics to "War Sucks" whilst the music was written by the whole band, Barthelme also wrote the music to "Pink Stainless Tail" whilst the lyrics were written by Thompson, "Parable of Arable Land" was written by the whole band while "Former Reflections Enduring Doubt" was entirely written by Cunningham.

Bonus tracks recorded before their debut album in an early 1967 demo session were released on the International Artists archive compilation Epitaph For A Legend in 1980, and were subsequently re-released on The Parable of Arable Land 2011 reissue. In a retrospective review of the compilation album Richie Unterberger wrote: "The five Red Krayola demos are prime acid folk". Unterberger also assessed "Hurricane Fighter Plane" as being "one of the closest American approximations of Syd Barrett-era Pink Floyd. Thompson's lyrics, while seemingly fitting in with the often surreal tone of typical 1960s psychedelic lyrics, actually demonstrate a more literary and artistic approach than what was common in rock music of the time.

Thompson also remarked in an interview with Reuters that during the recording session for "Hurricane Fighter Plane" he ran out of words so he decided to sing about the buckets of sand hanging on the studio wall.

Mayo Thompson talked about the demo tracks in an interview with Richie Unterberger in 1996: "That was, was a demo session.  They wanted to know, 'What material do you have?'  'Cause they'd heard us play live and wanted to know what else we had.  So they sent us in this small 16-track demo studio.  We got there and we thought we were going to be able to do some interesting recording, and found out that they just wanted a version of the tunes.  So, one gave them a version of the tunes and that was it.  So those tunes on there are stuff that they had lying around in the can from the demo days.  I don't know why.  They never were meant as releasable material, in the usual sense. Those are archival tapes, I would say.  The performances are what they are.

In a 1978 promotional booklet for the Radar Records reissues of International Artists material, Lelan Rogers mentions that the reason the Red Krayola never released a single was due in part to the controversy surrounding the sentimental lyrics in “War Sucks” - because of this, the album received little airplay as most radio stations refused to play the record. Additionally, Rogers claimed the album was already being supported by the 13th Floor Elevators who had been selling well, so there was no need to release a single. In the 2007 book "Eye Mind: Roky Erickson and the 13th Floor Elevators" author Paul Drummond mentions that the Red Crayola had recorded a session in February 1967 for "Dairymaid's Lament" and "Free Piece" to be released as a single, they were both songs that would later appear on their sophomore album, the session was produced by Bob Steffek who had a hit on Shazam Records with "Wild Woody"; however, the single was never released.

Reception 

According to Lelan Rogers, The Parable of Arable Land originally sold 50,000 copies when it was first released. At the time, the album was made on 600 dollars. Mayo Thompson remarked that they accomplished this with no advertising or promotion: "We sold 8-10,000 records in New York, and we sold some records in L.A., some in Frisco.  Major urban centers, obviously. International Artists did  not advertise. There were no band photographs. There was no promotion. This was making a virtue of your shortcomings. This was the beginnings of alternative rock".

The Berkeley Barb briefly reviewed The Parable of Arable Land in an article on the 1967 Berkeley Folk Festival which hosted the Red Krayola, their performances were met with mixed reception and were recorded with contact microphones by Mayo Thompson, they can be heard on Drag City's Live 1967: Their first LP was released by that strange Houston company International Artists, and it is selling far more than it should be because it looks like a rock LP and the liner notes, which are deceptive make it sound sort of like the mothers or something else which is recognizable. They later remarked - I like two of the cuts very much: "War Sucks" and "The Parable of Arable Land", and no doubt so will you about the third time thru. It took me that long.

The Chicago Seed reviewed the record on July 7, 1968 and described it as being "probably the freakiest album ever recorded" as well as describing "Hurricane Fighter Plane" as having "the freakiest lyrics ever" and the group making the ultimate statement on violence in "War Sucks". The article ends with a request to listen to the music while under the influence "Highly recommended for listening to when stoned, especially for the amazing channel separation"

The Beatles were stated to have had the record come to their attention, whilst British DJ John Peel reportedly could not wait to turn it off, he would later play excerpts from the album on his radio show a few years later amidst the album's reissue on Radar Records.

David Berman of Silver Jews had cited the record as a favorite.

Jimi Hendrix owned a copy of The Parable of Arable Land - Kathy Etchingham believes that Hendrix picked up the album on an impulse because the cover artwork was similar in style to his own drawings.

Record Mirror wrote about the album in 1978, assessing "Transparent Radiation" as "almost a normal song" and comparing Mayo Thompson's voice to sounding "terribly like Talking Heads, David Byrne" and the song as a whole as a  "total effect not unlike some Roxy Music opus, whilst "War Sucks" was spoken briefly about as an "odd raga weaving in and out".

Irish radio broadcaster Joe S. Harrington featured the LP on his "top 100 albums of all time" list.

In a retrospective review, Pitchfork critic Alex Linhardt praised The Parable of Arable Land as "one of the most visionary album[s]" of 1967. Trouser Press wrote that the album "boasts a more engaged intelligence than most of the era's aural acid baths". Mark Deming of AllMusic remarked that "The Parable of Arable Land exists on a plane all its own; if art-damaged noise rock began anywhere, it was on this album."

In 2011, The Parable of Arable Land was selected by Andrew VanWyngarden of MGMT for inclusion in NME list of "The 100 Greatest Albums You've Never Heard". He added, "I was pretty blown away by the fact that people were making sounds before Piper At The Gates Of Dawn and all the other ‘classic’ psychedelic albums, and that the sounds were being made by guys in Texas doing shitloads of LSD and making these completely wild records. I think it’s good that more people listen to them, because they go unheralded a lot of the time".

Spin magazine described "Transparent Radiation" as "the great-grandfather of the Spacemen 3/Spiritualized interstellar exploration division" and mentioned how "Hurricane Fighter Plane" had been covered many times.

In 2011 Sonic Boom would remaster the album from the original master tapes for a deluxe reissue.

The Parable of Arable Land was placed number 57 on Spin magazine's  list of "Top 100 Alternative Albums of the 1960s" and number 169 on Uncut magazine's "the 500 Greatest Albums of the 1960s" list.

Track listing 
The songs on side A and side B are the same for both mono and stereo versions; however, on the original LP, each song following the "Free Form Freak-Out" tracks is marked with a lengthy subtitle taken from the songs lyrics (except for the title track which is an instrumental collage and instead has its own special text).

In the 2011 Sonic Boom remaster, there are only 12 tracks displayed, as the "Free Form Freak-Out" following War Sucks is added as part of the song.

In popular culture
Pink Stainless Tail were a rock band which formed in Melbourne, Australia, who named themselves after the song.

The band Osees borrowed the bass riff of "Hurricane Fighter Plane" for the opening song "Block of Ice" from their album The Master's Bedroom Is Worth Spending a Night In in 2008.

John Dwyer remarked: "Block of Ice was obviously inspired by Red Krayola. We were doing a show with them, and have always loved them. Also Malcolm Mooney from Can. Really a blatant rip off, but bent towards what we are capable of. When we opened with it at the show, they ended up doing 'Hurricane Fighter Plane' for like 15 minutes. Pretty rad."

Personnel 
 The Red Crayola

 Frederick Barthelme – drums
 Steve Cunningham – bass guitar
 Mayo Thompson – guitar, vocals

 The Familiar Ugly (known members)
 Haydn Larson - spoons 
 Roger Hamilton AKA William West  
 Butch Caraban
 Pat Pritchett
 Pat Conley 
 Danny Schwartz
 Barbara (Potter) Metyko 
 Alicia Garza
 Linda Linda
 Donald Pick
 Elaine Banks
 Sara Quigles
 David Potter's Wife
 Joe Pritchett
 Dennis Glomm
 Ian Glennie
 Larry Frost
 Skip Gerson
 Helena or Helene (Skip Gerson's Girlfriend)
 Mike Metyko AKA F.R.B Rapho
 Jamie Jones
 George Farrar AKA Red
 Bill Smith 
 Carolyn Heinman
 Johndavid Bartlett
 Frank Simmons
 Steve Webb
 Mary Sue
 Dotty
 Candy

 Additional personnel
 Roky Erickson – organ ("Hurricane Fighter Plane"), harmonica ("Transparent Radiation")

 Technical
 Lelan Rogers – production
 Walt Andrus –  engineering
 Frank Davis –  engineering
 George Banks (Flash Graphics) – cover art

Release history 

This release includes extensive liner notes, including interviews and photographs

References

External links 
 

Radar Records albums
Red Krayola albums
1967 debut albums
International Artists albums